Paul Lowman is a Canadian musician. He is the bass player for Cuff the Duke.

Biography
Lowman grew up in Oshawa, Ontario where he played with fellow Cuff the Duke member Wayne Petti.  As Cuff the Duke picked up, He moved to Toronto.  Aside from Cuff the Duke, he has also played on albums by The Hylozoists and Hayden. Lowman is well known for his firm handshake and perfect beard.

Discography

 Life Stories for Minimum Wage (2002) – Cuff the Duke
 Cuff the Duke (2005) – Cuff the Duke
 Sidelines of the City (2007) – Cuff the Duke
 In Field & Town (2008) – Hayden
 La Fin Du Monde (2006) – The Hylozoists

External links
Cuff the Duke official website

Year of birth missing (living people)
Living people
Musicians from Oshawa
Canadian indie rock musicians
Canadian rock bass guitarists
Canadian country rock musicians